San Andrés de Agues (variants: Agüés; Agüis; San Andrés d'Agues) is one of three parishes (administrative divisions) in Sobrescobio, a municipality within the province and autonomous community of Asturias, in northern Spain.

Villages
 Agüés
 Soto
 San Andrés

Parishes in Sobrescobio